Sonoton Music claims to be the world's largest independently owned Production Music Library. Formed 1965 by Rotheide and Gerhard Narholz in Munich (Germany), the company owns the copyrights of over 130,000 compositions and musical recordings of all genres. With more than 35 subsidiaries worldwide, Sonoton Music licences the use of its music for TV, motion picture, advertising and internet productions.

History

1965
Rotheide and Gerhard Narholz establish Sonoton Music as a company in Munich, Germany. Gerhard Narholz, songwriter for artists such as Petula Clark, Bill Ramsey and Heidi Brühl, and composer for German feature films and television series, provides specific film and television music as background music, thus introducing library music in Germany.

1965 - 1970
Sonoton continues to develop the library business in Germany. The initial TV-specific music catalogue is expanded into a variety of genres through works of other composers.
1969 Sonoton enters the international market through the British BERRY MUSIC company, who sub-publishes Sonoton productions worldwide on the library music labels CONROY, STUDIO ONE and PROGRAMME PRODUCTIONS.
Sonoton enters the commercial record market, producing Easy Listening Music for Japan, which is released on Polydor Records and King Records, Tokyo.

1970 - 1980
Using the a.k.a. Norman Candler, Gerhard Narholz composes, arranges and conducts over 20 LPs with his large string orchestra, the MAGIC STRINGS, internationally released on the labels Decca Records/ Telefunken and King Records.
In 1971, Norman Candler receives the “3 Star Award” from BBC London for “Best Album of the Year”.
Sonoton expands its Easy Listening catalogue with recording artists Nelson Riddle, Billy May, Ted Heath, Acker Bilk, Xavier Cugat, Horst Jankowski and Franck Pourcel.

1973 EMI buys BERRY MUSIC, the former Sonoton agent in the UK. This marks the birth of Sonoton Music's own record label. The unicolored album covers for library music LPs are replaced with individually designed, full color sleeves.

1975 Sonoton Music introduces the British KPM label to the German market. More international labels follow.

1981 Sonoton Music establishes its world music label SAS (Sonoton AUTHENTIC SERIES).

1984 Sonoton Music is the first library to release its music on CD.

1987 Sonoton Music establishes the CNS label (COMMERCIALS NON STOP), featuring specific commercial and promo tracks.

1991 Sonoton Music represents SONIA Classics, a collection of classical works on CD, for synchronization.

1992 Sonoton Music is the first music library to present its own music search programme, SONOfind, on floppy disk.

1993 Sonoton is represented by ASSOCIATED PRODUCTION MUSIC (APM) in USA.

1995 Sonoton Music begins operating its own music recording studio in Munich, Germany.

1997 Sonoton Music creates its own sound effects series, SONOspheres, which focuses on atmospheric sounds and effects.

1998 Sonoton Music introduces an online music search programme and makes its entire repertoire accessible via the Internet.

2001 Sonoton Music opens a new digital 5.1 music recording studio in Munich and presents library DVDs with 5.1 mixes of large orchestral recordings.

2006 Sonoton Music offers its entire repertoire on hard drive including an offline search system.

2010 Sonoton Music is the first European production music library to release its SONOfind music search program as an app for iOS and Android based mobile devices.

Business model
Based on contracts with composers and recording artists, Sonoton Music owns the Synchronization and Performing Rights of its compositions and recordings, and licenses these rights to the audio-visual industry on a track-by-track or project-by-project basis. In countries where a Mechanical Copyright Society is in function (such as MCPS (Mechanical-Copyright Protection Society) in UK or GEMA in Germany), Synchronization Rights (the right to combine music with audio-visuals or/and advertising) are licensed through these societies. In all other countries (such as US) synchronization licenses have to be obtained from the local Sonoton Music representative.

Performing Rights (the right to perform music publicly, live or in any media, such as TV, film, etc...) are granted through local performing right societies, which usually have blanket agreements with broadcasters. Composers get their shares of licenses either through membership of a Mechanical and/or Performing Rights Societies, and/or through Sonoton, depending on the local legal conditions.

Notable Composers for Sonoton
 Geoff Bastow
 John Fox
 Dave Gage
 Horst Jankowski
 Gordon Mulrain
 Lelo Nazario
 Klaus Netzle
 Dieter Reith
 Gregor Narholz

Credits
Sonoton Music has been featured in productions such as (selection):
 Motion Picture: Harry Potter and the Prisoner of Azkaban, The SpongeBob SquarePants Movie, Fahrenheit 9/11, Kiss Kiss Bang Bang, Spider-Man 2, Frida, The Mummy, Platoon, Wonder Boys, City Slickers, Born on the Fourth of July, Natural Born Killers
 Television: The Sopranos, Medium, JAG, Sex and the City, The West Wing, Friends, The Drew Carey Show, The Daily Show, The Oprah Winfrey Show, SpongeBob SquarePants, The Young and the Restless, Days of Our Lives, Fifteen to One (Polish version), NFL Films, The Loud House (2016-2019)
 Video Games: X-Men Legends 2, Battlefield 2142, American Chopper: Full Throttle, Shrek 3, The Sims Games Series, Outlaw Golf 2, Gretsky 6, SOCOM 3: US Navy Seals, Saints Row, The Punisher, The Sopranos, WWE Smackdown! vs. Raw, Surf's Up, Fallout New Vegas, Ratchet & Clank Future: A Crack in Time
 Advertising: Mercedes-Benz, AT&T, Jack in the Box, Las Vegas Tourism Board

Further reading / Articles
 Official Sonoton website
 Wikipedia: Gerhard Narholz
 SONOfind music search

References

Production music
Entertainment companies established in 1965
Mass media companies established in 1965